The 1976 Hong Kong Sevens was the inaugural edition of the Hong Kong Sevens series held on 28 March 1976 at the Hong Kong Football Club Stadium in Happy Valley, Hong Kong. It was called Rothmans-Cathay PAcific International Seven-a-side Championship at that time and was organized by Hong Kong Rugby Football Union.

The draw was conducted on 23 February 1976 at The Excelsior Hotel.

Twelves teams are divided into four groups of three teams. The teams play a round-robin in their group in the first round, the winners advance to the semifinal and the other eight teams enter the plate knockout stage.

Teams 
 Pool A: Australia, Korea, Tonga
 Pool B: Hong Kong, Fiji, Malaysia
 Pool C: Singapore, Sri Lanka, Japan
 Pool D: Thailand, Cantabrians (New Zealand), Indonesia

Squad 

 Sri Lanka: Indrajit Coomaraswamy, Maiya Gunasekera, Mohan Balasuriya, L. Tonnekoon, R. Rodrigo, S. Ching, G. Gunadasa, J. de Jong, one unknown.
 Australia: Streeter, Hasell, Thomas, Gelling, Weekes, Bullsfield,
 Korea: Chong In Lee
 Tonga: Sami Latu, Malakai, Sutia, Polutele, Kainiu
 Fiji: Tuisese, Raluni, Cavuilati, Rauto
 Hong Kong: Dunkan, Ogolter, Lloyd, Kent, Cunningham
 Japan: Matsuo, Kumagayi, Fugowara, Nishizuma
 Singapore: Teo Han Chua, Crotty
 New Zealand: Purdon, Cartwright, Hales, Scott, McPhale, Davies, Hurst, Thomson

Format

Pool stage

Pool A

Source World Rugby

Pool B 

Source World Rugby

Pool C 

Source World Rugby

Pool D 

Source World Rugby

Knockout stage

Plate

Source: World Rugby

Main 

Source: World Rugby

Tournament placings

References

External links 

 Rugby Football 25巻 (in Japanese)

1976
rugby union
1976 in Asian rugby union
Hong Kong Sevens